Douglas Donald Davidson (born October 24, 1954) is an American Emmy Award winning television actor. He has portrayed Paul Williams on the CBS soap opera The Young and the Restless since May 1978, making him the series' longest-serving cast member

Career
Davidson appeared as captain of The Young and the Restless team when they played for charity on Family Feud several times from 1989 until 1995. Through connections he made during those appearances, Davidson eventually got a position hosting a five-night-a-week, syndicated, half-hour version of the game show The New Price Is Right, beginning on September 12, 1994. The show was canceled just four and a half months later on January 27, 1995. Davidson was one of a few people given an audition to replace Bob Barker after his retirement from The Price Is Right on June 15, 2007, a role which ultimately went to Drew Carey. Davidson has also hosted the live stage show adaptation, The Price Is Right Live!, at Harrah's-owned casinos in Las Vegas, Nevada.Davidson appeared in the 1996 pilot of the classic game show Card Sharks hosted by Tom Green (not to be confused with the formerly popular MTV personality of the same name) as a video clip in the bonus round.

From 1998 through 2003, Davidson served as a host of the annual Tournament of Roses Parade.

On September 12, 2018, it was reported that Davidson's contract was not renewed. Davidson confirmed that he was "not included" in the new direction for The Young and the Restless. In a turnaround following the departure of executive producer and head writer Mal Young, CBS announced on February 19, 2019 that Davidson would be returning to the role.

Personal life

He has been married to actress Cindy Fisher since 1984. They have two children, daughter Calyssa and son Caden.

Filmography

Awards and nominations

References

External links

1954 births
Living people
20th-century American male actors
21st-century American male actors
Male actors from Glendale, California
American male television actors
American male soap opera actors
Daytime Emmy Award winners
Daytime Emmy Award for Outstanding Lead Actor in a Drama Series winners
American game show hosts